Christina Chitwood (born 21 March 1990) is an American former competitive ice dancer who represented Great Britain with Mark Hanretty. They are two-time (2008, 2010) British bronze medalists and competed at the 2009 European Championships, placing 18th.

Competitive career 
Early in her career, Chitwood competed in pair skating with her brother, Will Chitwood. She later switched to ice dancing and competed with Stephen Chasman.

Chitwood and Scottish ice dancer Mark Hanretty decided to team up on 31 December 2005 and began training together properly in May 2006. Their training was disrupted by Chitwood's contraction of glandular fever (also known as mononucleosis). They made their debut at the 2007 British Championships at the National Ice Centre in Nottingham, Great Britain, in January 2007, finishing in 7th place.

Chitwood and Hanretty won bronze at the 2008 British Championships at IceSheffield in Sheffield in January 2008. In the summer of 2008, they were selected by the National Ice Skating Association (NISA) to join the Great Britain Squad (also known as Team Skate G.B.). This enabled them to represent Great Britain in elite international competitions. In September 2008, Chitwood and Hanretty made their international debut at the 2008 Nebelhorn Trophy in Oberstdorf, Germany, where they placed 10th. In November of that same year, they won the bronze medal in their second international competition, the Pavel Roman Memorial in Olomouc, Czech Republic.

Chitwood and Hanretty placed 4th at the 2009 British Championships at the National Ice Centre in Nottingham, in January 2009. However, their international success earlier in the season enabled them to qualify for the 2009 European Championships in Helsinki, Finland. At the event, they competed alongside the first-ranked British team, Sinead Kerr / John Kerr, and finished 18th.

In autumn 2009, Chitwood and Hanretty placed 8th at the 2009 Nebelhorn Trophy in Oberstdorf, Germany, fourth at the Ice Challenge in Graz, Austria, third at the 2009 NRW Trophy in Dortmund, Germany, and fourth at the Mont Blanc Trophy in Courmayeur, Italy. In November 2009, Chitwood and Hanretty won the bronze medal at the 2010 British Championships at IceSheffield in Sheffield. They were ranked third overall in the 2009–2010 NISA National Rankings, based on the personal best scores achieved during the 2009–2010 season. They retired from competition at the end of the season.

Chitwood and Hanretty received funding from the Lloyds TSB Local Heroes initiative.

Programs
(with Hanretty)

Competitive highlights

With Hanretty for the United Kingdom

With Chasman for the United States

Detailed competitive results

(with Mark Hanretty)

References

External links

 
 Lloyds TSB Local Heroes
 Official site

British female ice dancers
American female ice dancers
Living people
1990 births
Sportspeople from Sioux Falls, South Dakota
21st-century American women